The following is a list of awards and nominations received by South Korean girl group Crayon Pop.

Awards and nominations

Gaon Chart K-Pop Awards

Golden Disk Awards

Mnet Asian Music Awards

Melon Music Awards

Seoul Music Awards

Korean Music Awards

KBS Gayo Daechukje

Style Icon Awards

Korea Cultural Entertainment Awards

Hawaii International Music Award Festival (HIMAF)

Korea Wave Awards

Asia Model Awards

Singapore Entertainment Awards

Seoul Foreign Correspondents' Club Awards

Seoul International Youth Film Festival

MTV IGGY's

Notes

References 

Crayon Pop
Awards